New Castle is an unincorporated place in Decatur Township, Clearfield County, Pennsylvania.  It is located between West Decatur and Houtzdale.

Unincorporated communities in Clearfield County, Pennsylvania
Unincorporated communities in Pennsylvania